Agriculture in Ireland began during the neolithic era, when inhabitants of the isle began to practice animal husbandry and farming grains. Principal crops grown during the neolithic era included barley and wheat.

Following the Acts of Union 1800, the majority of rural Irish workers participated in the agricultural sector of Ireland's economy.

History

Prehistory and early history 
Since the Ice age the underlying geology of the island of Ireland has led to the formation of base rich soils, which combined with the temperate maritime climate has meant the island has been a place well-suited to the cultivation of grass and the rearing of cattle. The soils in Ireland are active biologically and are typically moderately leached.

During the Ireland's neolithic era, which lasted from around 4000 B.C. until 2500 B.C., Ireland saw its first instances of animal husbandry and the farming of grains. The era saw the introduction of cattle and sheep as domesticated animals into Ireland and saw the start of dairy production in Ireland. Large herbivorous mammals such as the European Elk and the Aurochs were not naturally present on the island at that time, showcasing the importance of managing cattle as a food source.

The principle crops during the neolithic era in Ireland were species of barley and wheat.

Medieval history

Early modern history 
In the years following the Acts of Union 1800, the majority of the Irish rural laborers participated in agriculture. Most rural laborers did not sustain themselves based solely upon their wages, but also had to cultivate a small plot of land to sustain themselves. Irishmen ordinarily rented this land from landlords in exchange for their labor, rather than paying for rent with money. Much of the land was rented as a conacre, an arrangement in which farmers were granted the right to farm a plot of land but did not create a landlord-renter contract, though this practice was more common in Connacht and Munster than in Lenister and Ulster.

Great Famine 

From 1821 to 1841 the agricultural labour force grew by half, the cost would have to have been met by a difficult to achieve 1% annual growth in production.
In 1845, potatoes accounted for a little under a third of tilled acreage in Ireland, with it being the food source that three million people were exclusively dependent on. In the 1830s and the beginning of the 1840s, a large part of livestock numbers were exported and also up to one quarter of grain that was produced.

From 1840 to 1845 the labour force involved in agriculture was 1.6 million people. The Great Famine caused the death of an estimated 1 million people. Potato acreage, over 2 million acres in 1845, reduced more than half to a little over 1 million acres in 1846, to 0.3 million in 1847 and back up to 0.7 million acres in the year 1848.

In 1854 total agricultural output in Ireland had a value of £47.4 million. In the decades following the famine, the majority of merchandise exports were still due to agriculture, farming accounted for a third of national output and over half the working population were employed in the occupation.

Post-famine 
Throughout the twentieth century, agricultural land in Ireland increasingly shifted away from use as arable land and increasingly towards use as pasture. 

Following on from the first inter-country ploughing championship held in 1931 in Athy, Kildare, a popular yearly event in Ireland is the  National Ploughing Championships; in 2018 it drew 281,000 visitors over three days.

The liberation of the Irish Free State from the United Kingdom of Great Britain and Ireland brought about differences in agricultural development throughout all Ireland. In 1926, a few years after the conclusion of the Irish Civil War, the majority of the Free State's employment was generated from the agriculture industry, while about one-quarter of the employment of Northern Ireland was in the agricultural sector. After the 1932 Irish general election resulted in a Fianna Fáil government, the Free State adopted significant protectionist policies ordered towards ensuring agricultural self-sufficiency.

The protectionist policies ordered by Fianna Fáil had substantial effects on the agricultural sector in Ireland. With respect to international trade, the U.K. retaliated against newly-adopted Irish agricultural and land policies with tariffs against certain Irish agricultural products, including cattle; agricultural exports from the Free State to the United Kingdom were cut in half during the first half of the 1930s. The policies also distorted the domestic market for several agricultural goods, especially wheat, which by 1936 had a domestic price of over double the that of the commodity on the global market.

Types of farming

Livestock

Regulation 
The agricultural industry in Ireland is under the responsibility of the Department of Agriculture, Food and the Marine (An Roinn Talmhaíochta, Bia agus Mara). Bord Bia is responsible for promoting the food and horticultural products of the industry and Teagasc has a role in research and providing information to farmers.

Trade

Imports
In 2020, Ireland's imports of Agri-food products totalled $10.978 billion.

Exports
In 2021, exports from Ireland of food, drink and horticulture (Agri-food) had a value of €13.5 billion, with international markets outside of the European Union and United Kingdom accounting for 34% of exports, and the European Union itself being the largest export destination at €4.5 billion value. International markets outside of the EU and UK accounted for 34% Of Ireland's exports, €5 billion of which were from the dairy industry, with €3.5 billion from meat and livestock; of those beef exports constituted €2.1 billion, pig-meat €542 million, sheep-meat €420 million and primary poultry at €128 million .

Agriculture today
Agriculture in Ireland is a major component of the modern economy of the Republic of Ireland. A major livestock producer, Ireland has very limited horticultural and grain production on account of its topography and climate. Ireland manufactures many derivatives and value-added products from its livestock base. However, much of its beef and dairy products are exported. Ireland imports around 80 percent of its animal feed, food, and beverage needs. Ireland receives a considerable proportion of its agricultural commodity and grocery product needs from the United Kingdom, although this declined by 25 percent in the first half of 2021 on account of additional customs and logistical complexities following the U.K.’s departure from the European Union. Ireland also imports from E.U. countries such as the Netherlands (beer, cut flowers), France (beer, wine), and Italy (wine, non-alcoholic beverages). Major third country trading partners are Chile (wine, apples), Argentina (wine, animal feed), and New Zealand (wine, bovine semen). Ireland is a key destination for U.S. animal feed ingredient exports. However, the United States is currently not a major direct supplier of food and beverage products. Ireland generally receives many U.S. products including wine, fresh and dried fruit, and confectionery via the U.K., but some products may now route to Ireland via France or the Netherlands, or be shipped directly from the United States post-Brexit.

As of 2018, the Central Intelligence Agency estimates that 66.1% of Ireland's land is used for agriculture; 50.7% of Ireland's land is permanent pasture, while 15.4% of its land is arable. Major agricultural products of Ireland include milk, barley, beef, wheat, potatoes, pork, oats, poultry, mushrooms/truffles, and mutton.

According to a September 2020 report by the Irish Department of Agriculture, Food and the Marine, 164,400 Irish citizens are employed in the agricultural industry, comprising 7.1% of Ireland's workforce.

See also 
Agriculture in the United Kingdom
Common Agricultural Policy
Teagasc

References 

Agriculture in the Republic of Ireland